"Queens for a Day" is the third episode in the American dramedy series Ugly Betty, which aired on October 12, 2006. Although this is the third episode overall in the series, it is listed as the second episode on the first season DVD release, while "The Box and the Bunny" was listed as episode 3.

Plot
At a club to celebrate Daniel's first issue party, Bradford congratulates Daniel on his success as Mode'''s editor-in-chief. Wilhelmina spoils the festivities when she compares Daniel to how his older brother Alex revamped Hudson magazine, which prompts Daniel to set out to put his own mark on Mode. Meanwhile, Betty goes home after being turned away from the party, and Hilda worries that Betty is not fitting in at Mode and offers to give her a makeover, but Betty dismisses her concerns. Betty scolds Ignacio for drinking coffee, which is not recommended by his medication. He tells her that he is running low on his pills but Betty insists that Ignacio take his medication as prescribed and the family will find a way to get him a refill.

The next day, Daniel enlists Betty for a brainstorming session to change the look of Mode by looking through back issues of Hudson for inspiration. Betty discovers a series of past layouts from Vincent Bianchi, but Daniel tells Betty that Vincent vowed that he would never work for Meade Publications because of differences of opinion with Alex. Back at home, Betty learns from Ignacio that Vincent and his family lived four blocks away from them. With this information, Betty uses her Queens connections to convince Vincent to meet with Mode to discuss a photoshoot. Daniel asks Betty to book a meeting at a posh restaurant, and invites Betty join them. Betty enlists Hilda to help with the makeover and arrives to work, confident in her new look. But at a staff meeting, Wilhelmina disparages Daniel's proposed changes and mockingly compares them to Betty's new look.

Embarrassed, Betty decides not to go to the restaurant, so Daniel and Bradford take Amanda, who pretends to be Betty. As the three pitch the photoshoot concept to Vincent, Betty discovers the proposal document has been left behind on her desk and delivers it to the restaurant. Vincent is pleased to meet the real Betty he liked on the phone, thus salvaging the meeting and he agrees to work for Mode. Meanwhile, Wilhelmina prepares for a big meeting with "the senator", who turns out to be her unimpressed father who is disappointed that Wilhelmina is still not editor-in-chief.

Bradford orders his private investigator Steve to track down the car Fey Sommers was driving at the time of her death. Steve finds the vehicle up for auction at an auto salvage yard but so does the mysterious masked woman. The masked woman calls Daniel and advises him to ask Bradford about the car auction.  When Daniel confronts him, Bradford lies and claims that the person calling must be a prank. Wilhelmina and the masked woman discuss how to use Fey's car to further drive a wedge between Daniel and Bradford.

Reception
In its review of the episode, Entertainment Weekly''s Michael Sleazak noted that "Tonight's episode, the series' third, was the best Betty to date, filled with so many zippy one-liners and juicy set details that our heroine's Extreme Makeover: Queens Edition played out as more of a side dish than a main course."

Other features
This episode also featured the second installment of the telenovelita Vidas de Fuego, which starred Marlene Favela, Ninel Conde and Helena Rojo.

Featured music
The club setting in the episode features music from The Voodoo Trombone Quartet ("Voodoo Juju"), The Pussycat Dolls ("Buttons"), Shakira ("Hips Don't Lie"), Los Niños de Sara ("La Cubanita") and Rihanna ("Unfaithful").

References

Also starring
Michael Urie - Marc St. James
Kevin Sussman - Walter
Elizabeth Payne - Masked Woman
Stelio Savante - Steve
Ron Canada - Senator Slater

Guest stars

Rhys Coiro - Vincent Bianchi
Thea Vidale - Cholli
Greg Proops - TV Fashion Reporter
Gilles Marini - Jean-Luc
Eve Mauro - Assistant
Jill Latiano - Model
Andy Kreiss - Host
Ash Christian - Jeff
Stephen Keys - Doorman
Teresa Huang - Reporter #1
Ron Butler - Reporter #2
Mark Hames - Waiter
Arturo Carmona - TV Villain 
Ninel Conde - TV Sexy Woman
Marlene Favela - TV Esmeralda
Patricia Manterola - TV Dancer
Marco Méndez - TV Guy
Eduardo Rodríguez - Soccer Player
Helena Rojo - TV Mother
Sebastián Rulli - TV Handsome Guy
Sherlyn - TV Girl #1
África Zavala - TV Girl #2

Ugly Betty (season 1) episodes
2006 American television episodes